Kangiqsujuaq is a northern village (Inuit community) in Nunavik, Nord-du-Québec, Quebec, Canada. It had a population of 837 in the Canada 2021 Census. The community has also been known as Wakeham Bay. The name "Kangiqsujuaq" means "the large bay" in Inuktitut.

It is located on the Ungava Peninsula, on the Cap du Prince-de-Galles on the Hudson Strait.  It is served by the small Kangiqsujuaq Airport.

During winter, when the tides are extremely low, local Inuit sometimes climb beneath the shifting sea ice to gather blue mussels. They break holes in the ice and then can walk for a short time on the exposed sea bed and collect this food. This risky way of gathering the mussels goes back for generations.

As the other villages of the Kativik region, the Kativik Regional Police Force provides police services in Kangiqsujuaq.

Kangiqsujuaq is the closest community to the Qajartalik archaeological site, a site featuring petroglyphs created by the Dorset culture. In 2017, it was announced that the Qajartalik would be added to Canada's tentative list for nomination to the UNESCO World Heritage Site list.

Demographics 

Education
The Kativik School Board operates the Arsaniq School.

References

External links 

 Official Site (English version)
 If the Weather Permits, a documentary about life in Kangiqsujuaq.
Video of mussel gathering

Inuit communities in Quebec
Road-inaccessible communities of Quebec